Raymond Meijs (born 13 March 1968) is a Dutch former road cyclist, who competed as a professional from 1992 to 2001. He notably won the Hel van het Mergelland a record four times in his career, as well as the UCI Junior World Road Race Championships in 1985.

Major results

1985
 1st  Road race, UCI Junior Road World Championships
 1st  Road race, National Junior Road Championships
1986
 2nd Road race, National Junior Road Championships
1988
 1st Drielandenomloop
 3rd Ronde van Overijssel
 4th Overall Circuit Franco-Belge
1989
 2nd Overall Tour de Liège
1st Stage 1
 2nd Drielandenomloop
1990
 1st Hel van het Mergelland
 1st Stage 2 Étoile du Brabant
 2nd Grand Prix de Waregem
 3rd Overall Tour de Liège
1st Stage 2
1991
 1st Overall Tour de Liège
1st Stage 2a
 1st Stage 7 Niedersachsen Rundfahrt
 3rd Road race, National Amateur Road Championships
 10th Grand Prix d'Isbergues
1993
 2nd Grand Prix de Wallonie
 4th Grote Prijs Jef Scherens
1994
 7th Grand Prix d'Isbergues
 10th Grand Prix Cerami
1995
 3rd Grote Prijs Stad Zottegem
 4th Nokere Koerse
 9th Tour de Berne
1996
 3rd Hel van het Mergelland
1997
 1st Hel van het Mergelland
 5th Druivenkoers-Overijse
1998
 1st Hel van het Mergelland
 3rd Schaal Sels
 3rd Grote Prijs Jef Scherens
1999
 1st Hel van het Mergelland
 2nd Rund um Köln
 2nd Rund um den Flughafen Köln-Bonn
 3rd Road race, National Road Championships
2000
 2nd Groningen–Münster
 4th Road race, National Road Championships
 10th Sparkassen Giro Bochum
2001
 2nd Dwars door Gendringen

References

External links 

1968 births
Living people
Dutch male cyclists
Sportspeople from Valkenburg aan de Geul
Cyclists from Limburg (Netherlands)